The Delhi Public School Society or DPS Society is a chain of schools. The descriptor "Public School" references the model of the long-established public schools in the United Kingdom. The Delhi Public School Society is the administrative authority for all its institutions in India and abroad.

History
The first school associated with the Delhi Public School Society was Delhi Public School, Mathura Road established in 1949. The foundation stone of the school building was laid in 1956 by Vice President S. Radhakrishnan.

Accreditation
The Central Board of Secondary Education (CBSE) provides accreditation for all schools in the society except for four; DPS New Town, Kolkata; DPS Mega City, Kolkata; and DPS International, Singapore, are affiliated with the Indian Certificate of Secondary Education (ICSE), whilst DPS International, Saket, New Delhi, is affiliated with the International General Certificate of Secondary Education (IGCSE),

List of Schools

Core Schools
As of April 2022, there are 13 original or core branches of the Delhi Public School. The list of core schools is as follows:

 Delhi Public School, Mathura Road, New Delhi
 Delhi Public School, R. K. Puram, New Delhi
 Delhi Public School, Sector-30, Noida, Uttar Pradesh
 Delhi Public School, Vasant Kunj, New Delhi

 Delhi Public School, Faridabad, Haryana
 Delhi Public School, Greater Noida, Uttar Pradesh 
 Delhi Public School, Bulandshahr, Uttar Pradesh 
 Delhi Public School, Rohini, New Delhi
 Delhi Public School, Dwarka, New Delhi
 Delhi Public School, Navi Mumbai 
 Delhi Public School International, Saket 
 Delhi Public School, Knowledge Park-5
 Delhi Public School, Sector-122, Noida

Franchise school

As of April 2022, there are around 206 schools running under the DPS Society as franchises. These are not the core schools ones and are not managed directly by the DPS Society.

Controversy
Due to its legacy, good academic and extra curricular performance and alumni network, schools affiliated with the Delhi Public School Society are considered to be one of the best in India. This has given rise to situation where other schools not affiliated to the "Delhi Public School Society" have named and branded themselves as DPS schools.

The first such case was that of the "Delhi Public School Ghaziabad Society" which was started in collaboration with the Delhi Public School Society but later became a separate organisation, and currently runs a chain of eight schools. A court case was filed in 2002 in the Delhi High Court by the Delhi Public School Society against the Delhi Public School Ghaziabad Society was dismissed for lack of jurisdiction.

A second case, involved DPS alumni and society president Salman Khurshid, starting a parallel organisation DPS World Foundation to run schools under the name of DPS World Schools. Khurshid was thrown out of the DPS society and a case was filed against his foundation. 
 The Supreme Court of India decided in favour of DPS society and DPS World Foundation changed its name to Delhi World Foundation and currently runs a chain of 60 schools named Delhi World Public Schools.

The third such case was of the DPS Trust.The organisation based in Rohini, New Delhi offered franchises to open schools under the brand name of DPS in smaller cities. The Delhi High Court, on 16 December 2012, barred the ‘DPS Trust’ from using the name ‘DPS’ or its registered logo as well as the name Delhi Public School for running a school or education-related services. The trust was ordered to pay Rs 10 lakh as damages.

References

External links

 

 
Non-profit organisations based in India
Central Board of Secondary Education
Educational organisations based in India
Schools in Delhi
1949 establishments in India
Educational institutions established in 1949